Eugene Delos Parkinson (February 21, 1850 – October 9, 1936) was an American farmer and politician.

Born in the town of Fayette, Lafayette County, Wisconsin, Parkinson went to the public and private school in Fayette, Wisconsin. Parkinson was a farmer. From 1903 to 1905, Parkinson served as sheriff for Lafayette County. He also served on the school board. Parkinson served on the Lafayette Town Board and was chairman of the town board. In 1911, Parkinson served in the Wisconsin State Assembly and was a Democrat. Parkinson died at his home in Fayette, Wisconsin after a short illness.

Notes

External links

1850 births
1936 deaths
People from Fayette, Wisconsin
Farmers from Wisconsin
Wisconsin sheriffs
Wisconsin city council members
Mayors of places in Wisconsin
School board members in Wisconsin
Democratic Party members of the Wisconsin State Assembly